Kontoleon Tornikios was the Catapan of Italy from May to September 1017. He was originally the strategos of Cephallenia. As strategos, he accompanied the catapan Basil Mesardonites to Apulia in 1011. Basil died in 1016 and Leo was nominated to replace him, arriving in May. At the time, Melus of Bari had risen in revolt again, this time with a band of Normans. Leo sent Leo Passianos with an army against him. Passianos and Melus met on the Fortore at Arenula. The battle was either indecisive (William of Apulia) or a victory for Melus (Leo of Ostia). Tornikios then took command himself and led them into a second encounter near Civita. This second battle was a victory for Melus, though Lupus Protospatharius and the anonymous chronicler of Bar record a defeat. A third battle, a decisive victory for Melus, occurred at Vaccaricia, near the site of later Troia. The entire region from the Fortore to Trani had fallen to Melus and in September, Tornikios was relieved of his duties in favour of Basil Boioannes.

Notes

Sources
Chalandon, Ferdinand. Histoire de la domination normande en Italie et en Sicile. Paris, 1907.

11th-century catepans of Italy
Byzantine generals
Kontoleon